The Ridgewood Public Schools is a comprehensive community public school district serving students in pre-kindergarten through twelfth grade from suburban Ridgewood, in Bergen County, New Jersey, United States.

As of the 2020–21 school year, the district, comprised of 10 schools, had an enrollment of 5,613 students and 432.6 classroom teachers (on an FTE basis), for a student–teacher ratio of 13.0:1.

The district is classified by the New Jersey Department of Education as being in District Factor Group "J", the highest of eight groupings. District Factor Groups organize districts statewide to allow comparison by common socioeconomic characteristics of the local districts. From lowest socioeconomic status to highest, the categories are A, B, CD, DE, FG, GH, I and J.

Awards, recognition and rankings
Benjamin Franklin Middle School was awarded the Blue Ribbon School Award of Excellence by the United States Department of Education, the highest award an American school can receive, during the 1998-99 school year.

For the 1993-94 school year, George Washington Middle School was named a "Star School" by the New Jersey Department of Education, the highest honor that a New Jersey school can achieve. For the 1995-96 school year, Benjamin Franklin Middle School was named a "Star School".

The district's high school was the 28th-ranked public high school in New Jersey out of 339 schools statewide in New Jersey Monthly magazine's September 2014 cover story on the state's "Top Public High Schools", using a new ranking methodology. The school had been ranked 28th in the state of 328 schools in 2012, after being ranked 20th in 2010 out of 322 schools listed.

Schools 
Schools in the district (with 2020–21 enrollment data from the National Center for Education Statistics) are:

Pre-school
Glen School with 60 students in PreK and Private Day Care Center
Elementary schools
Henrietta Hawes Elementary School with 593 students in grades K-5
Dr. Paul Semendinger, Principal
Orchard Elementary School with 299 students in grades K-5
Mary K. Ferreri, Principal
Ridge Elementary School with 443 students in grades K-5
Dr. Jean H. Schoenlank, Principal
Irwin B. Somerville Elementary School with 383 students in grades K-5
Dr. Lorna Oates-Santos, Principal
Ira W. Travell Elementary School with 377 students in grades K-5
Brian Ross, Principal
Willard Elementary School with 461 students in grades K-5
Caroline Hoffman, Principal
Middle schools
Benjamin Franklin Middle School with 698 students in grades 6-8
Anthony Orsini, Principal
George Washington Middle School with 666 students in grades 6-8
Dr. Katie Kashmanian, Principal
High school
Ridgewood High School with 1,775 students in grades 9-12
Jeffrey M. Nyhuis, Principal

Athletics 
Ridgewood High School's sports teams are nicknamed the Maroons. Ridgewood High School is one of 41 public and private high schools from Bergen, Essex and Passaic counties that are members of the Big North Conference.

Administration 
Core members of the school district's administration include:
Dr. Thomas A. Gorman, Superintendent
Scott T. Bisig, Business Administrator / Board Secretary

Superintendent search 
The Ridgewood Board of Education had been searching for a new superintendent since July 1, 2006, with Dr. Paul Arilotta, previously Principal of Travell School, serving as an interim replacement during the year-long search. The Board hired Martin Brooks as Superintendent, effective July 1, 2007. However, in mid-June, Brooks declined the invitation for what the Board described as personal reasons, though there was community opposition to Brooks' appointment that was said to have made him "feel unwelcome". This has led to the beginning of another search, and another year of the district hiring an interim superintendent, until a permanent replacement is hired and assumes the position. The New York Times reported that this is the result of a dispute over the district's reform math program.

Dr. Daniel Fishbein, a Ridgewood parent and previous superintendent of the Glen Ridge Public Schools, served as superintendent from 2008 to 2020.

In December 2020, Dr. Thomas Gorman, then principal of Ridgewood High school stepped in as interim superintendent. In March 2021, he was formally appointed to the position of Superintendent of Schools.

Board of education
The district's board of education, is comprised of five elected trustees, currently President Michael Lembo, Vice President HyunJu Kwak, Sheila Brogan, Saurabh Dani, and Cristopher Kaufman. The board sets policy and oversees the fiscal and educational operation of the district through its administration. As a Type II school district, the board's trustees are elected directly by voters to serve three-year terms of office on a staggered basis, with either one or two seats up for election each year held (since 2021) as part of the November general election. The board appoints a superintendent to oversee the district's day-to-day operations and a business administrator to supervise the business functions of the district.

In a November 2020 referendum, voters supported by a nearly 3-2 margin an initiative that moved both Ridgewood's school elections (from April) and municipal elections (from May) to November .

Global learning
Ridgewood Public Schools participated in the "Rural School Project". The goal of the project is to build a school for children in Cambodia to overcome the challenges their people have faced from the genocide at the hands of the Khmer Rouge, the communist political party, in the 1970s. George Washington Middle School, Benjamin Franklin Middle School, Orchard Elementary School, and Travell Elementary School participated in the student-centered fundraising effort. Ridgewood focused on having students tap into their strengths and talents to make a difference on a global level.

Ridgewood Public Schools began the fundraising effort in the summer of 2007, in collaboration with parents, to participate in the Rural School Project. The Rural School Project is funded through a nonprofit organization, The American Assistance for Cambodia/Japan Relief for Cambodia (AAfC). The project was initiated by two Ridgewood parents, Lisa Summers and Liz Louizedes. Students, parents, teachers, and administrators convened regularly to provide support for students and articulating the effort across the entire district. The goal of the program was to initially raise $21,500 for the school construction. Nominal fundraising efforts would take place after the school's inception to sustain its progress. Ridgewood Schools is raising funds in collaboration with American Assistance for Cambodia/Japan Relief for Cambodia (AAfC). AAfC is a nonprofit organization and has established a proven program. It has led the effort to construct over 300 Cambodian schools with matching funds from the World Bank and Asian Development Bank.

The Ridgewood Village School will create a structure for Ridgewood students to communicate with Cambodian students via email and participate in global citizenship and distance learning. Ongoing fundraising efforts will allow the Ridgewood Village School to build a water well, create a vegetable garden, and hire a full-time cook for the school to provide a nutritious breakfast and lunch for Cambodian students.

The fundraising supported the construction cost of a rural school (includes the building, desks, chairs), a full-time trained English/computer teacher for 2 years, 3 solar panels to provide basic electric for lighting and computers, and books.

In February 2009, several representatives from Ridgewood, including students, parents, teachers, and administrators, visited the Ridgewood Village School in Cambodia for the ribbon-cutting ceremony. The representatives brought gifts for students and contributed to the improvement of the village.

References

External links 
 

School Data for the Ridgewood Public Schools, National Center for Education Statistics
Village of Ridgewood Math -- concerned parent group

Ridgewood, New Jersey
New Jersey District Factor Group J
School districts in Bergen County, New Jersey